Belden is a ghost town in Pine County, in the U.S. state of Minnesota.

History
A post office called Belden was established in 1913, and remained in operation until 1943. Belden had a depot on the Soo Railway.

References

Geography of Pine County, Minnesota
Ghost towns in Minnesota